The 1957–58 FAW Welsh Cup is the 71st season of the annual knockout tournament for competitive football teams in Wales.

Key
League name pointed after clubs name.
B&DL - Birmingham & District League
FL D2 - Football League Second Division
FL D3N - Football League Third Division North
FL D3S - Football League Third Division South
SFL - Southern Football League

Fifth round
Ten winners from the Fourth round and six new clubs.

Sixth round

Semifinal
Chester and Hereford United played at Wrexham, replay - at Swansea, Caernarfon Town and Wrexham played at Bangor.

Final
Final were held at Chester, replay - at Wrexham.

External links
The FAW Welsh Cup

1957-58
Wales
Cup